The University of Valley Forge (UVF) is a private university in Phoenixville, Pennsylvania, 8.8 miles from Valley Forge National Historical Park. It is affiliated with the Assemblies of God and offers several Bachelors and Masters programs.

History
The University of Valley Forge began as a summer Bible School on the campgrounds of Maranatha Park in Green Lane, Pennsylvania, in  1932.  It existed for the training of pastors, evangelists, missionaries, Christian education workers and lay workers.  The summer Bible School grew into a permanent Bible School and, in 1939, was chartered as Maranatha Bible School.  Mergers with Beulah Heights Bible Institute, Metropolitan Bible Institute, New England Bible Institute and Pine Crest Bible School resulted in increased enrollment and a name change to Eastern Bible Institute and later, Northeast Bible Institute.  The university moved in 1976 to the campus of the former Valley Forge Army Hospital in Phoenixville.

Today the school has an enrollment of over 500 students, offers 40+ undergraduate programs  and ten graduate programs.  In the summer of 2002 the college was granted accreditation with Middle States Association of Colleges and Schools.

Valley Forge Christian College officially changed its name to the University of Valley Forge on September 16, 2014.

Academics
The University of Valley Forge is approved by the Department of Education of the Commonwealth of Pennsylvania to grant the degrees of Master of Arts, Bachelor of Arts, Bachelor of Music, Bachelor of Religious Education, Bachelor of Science, Bachelor of Social Work, Associate of Arts, and Associate of Science. The university is accredited by the Middle States Commission on Higher Education.

Athletics
Valley Forge teams, the Patriots, compete at the Division III level of the National Collegiate Athletic Association (NCAA). The university joined the Colonial States Athletic Conference in the 2020-2021 academic year. Men's sports include baseball, basketball, cross country, golf and soccer; while women's sports include basketball, cross country, soccer, softball and volleyball.

References

External links
 Official website
 Official athletics website

Educational institutions established in 1931
Universities and colleges affiliated with the Assemblies of God
Universities and colleges in Chester County, Pennsylvania
1931 establishments in Pennsylvania
Private universities and colleges in Pennsylvania